California's 37th congressional district special election, 2007 was held on August 21, 2007 to replace the seat of Congresswoman Juanita Millender-McDonald, who died of cancer on April 22, 2007. California State Assemblymember Laura Richardson received the plurality of votes in an open primary election on June 26. Since no candidate won a majority of votes in that contest, the special election was held on August 21, in which Richardson was the winner.

Candidates
Democratic
Lee Davis  - publisher
Mervin Evans - Army veteran, businessman, and frequent candidate
Felicia Ford - Corporate Executive Officer
Bill Francisco Grisolia - Paralegal/Businessman
Peter Mathews University Professor
Valerie McDonald - daughter of deceased Rep. Millender-McDonald
Jenny Oropeza - State Senator, 2007–Present; State Assemblywoman, 2001-2007; Long Beach City Councilmember, 1995-2001
George Parmer Jr. - truck driver
Jeffrey Price - Workers Compensation Attorney
Laura Richardson - State Assemblywoman, 2007–Present, Long Beach Councilmember, 2001-2005
Ed Wilson - Signal Hill Councilmember, 1997–Present

Republican
Leroy Joseph Guillory - minister
John M. Kanaley - War Veteran
Jeffrey "Lincoln" Leavitt - teacher
Teri Ramirez - Businesswoman/mother

Green
Daniel Abraham Brezenoff - Clinical social worker and activist

Libertarian
Herb Peters - Retired aerospace engineer

Historically Democratic district
The district has been historically Democratic.  In the 2004 Presidential election, John Kerry received 74% of the vote and George W. Bush received 25% of the vote. The district has a Cook Partisan Voting Index score of D +27.  The district's high African American and Mexican American populations also make the district lean Democrat because those groups have tended to vote with the Democrats.  It came as little surprise when Republican John M. Kanaley received 5,309 votes or 25.24% of the total.  After the June 26 election, various articles that appeared in the Los Angeles Times and the Long Beach Press-Telegram all but declared Richardson the eventual winner (see references below).

Democratic Party Involvement

Democratic Party endorses Oropeza, May 19, 2007
A spokesman for the Democratic Congressional Campaign Committee told TheHill.com that the committee had no plans to get involved in the election.  Despite making claims to originally stay out of the Congressional race, the Democratic Party endorsed Oropeza on May 19, 2007.  Oropeza took 119 of the 168 ballots cast by party delegates, or 71 percent, reaching the 60 percent threshold needed to win the party's endorsement .

Involvement from out of district officials
Richardson accused Senate President Pro Tem Don Perata of having "dumped 130 people here" from outside the district to throw the democratic party vote to Oropeza . In the race, Perata supported fellow State Senator Oropeza.  Richardson was endorsed by several California State Assembly members that included Speaker Fabian Nunez, Majority Leader Karen Bass, Assembly member Mervyn Dymally, and former Speaker Willie Brown.

Race

The Black vote
McDonald won only two votes from party delegates at the Democratic party endorsement. The vast majority of black delegates in attendance voted for Richardson, while Oropeza won all but a few of the Latino, white and Filipino delegates.  Blacks make up roughly 25% of registered voters.  Many black leaders saw this election as a test of their political clout.  As Millender-McDonald was Black, Black leaders wanted to hang onto the congressional seat that had been held by an African-American, even as the seat's Latino population has grown rapidly.  Black Congresswoman Maxine Waters also endorsed Richardson, as did many black state representatives.

The McDonald factor
Originally, the membership of the Congressional Black Caucus was divided between those who supported Richardson and those who supported  Valerie McDonald, daughter of the late Millender-McDonald. McDonald was backed by US Congresswoman Diane Watson and some local churches and other political leaders.  McDonald is the executive director of the African American Women Health and Education Foundation in Carson, a nonprofit founded by her mother.  Some black leaders feared that the two black candidates would split the vote and lead to an Oropeza victory.  Polls that were conducted began to justify that fear. Seeing this fact, many Black leaders began to rally around and throw their support to Richardson over McDonald.

The Latino vote
While the growing Latino vote represented 40% of the district's population, the Latino vote was about 21%.  Most major Latino leaders and organizations, including the Congressional Hispanic Caucus, also supported Orepeza.

Labor versus Indian gaming
The race can also be seen as a contest between two of California's interest groups: Labor and Indian gaming.   The two groups clashed over five tribal compacts that would doubled the number of slot machines at Indian casinos. Labor groups fought the compacts because they believed the compacts did not adequately protect workers.

Richardson had strong financial support from organized labor that included the Los Angeles County Federation of Labor, which provided volunteers to walk precincts and make phone calls in the final days of the race.  The Los Angeles County Federation of Labor spent $275,000 on Richardson's campaign and put more than 1,000 union members on the street, made 45,000 phone calls and distributed 166,000 pieces of mail.  Oropeza voted for the compacts.  The tribes showed their gratitude by spending $457,000 of independently on television ads in Oropeza's support.  Morongo Band of Mission Indians spent $440,000 alone.

Polling

Results
Of the 25 candidates who originally filed, 17 appeared on the ballot; running were eleven Democrats, four Republicans, one Green, and one Libertarian.

Low turnout
Voter turnout was very low during this special election.  Many voters were unaware that a special election was occurring.  The absentee ballot drives were a part of both sides campaign strategies because of the expected low turnout. Over 10,000 absentee ballots were processed by the Los Angeles County registrar-recorder despite there being 265,000 registered voters.  11% of the district's 265,000 registered voters cast ballots in the primary, and only 8% cast ballots on August 21.

Analysis
While race was a factor in the results of the election, some Blacks voters and leaders supported Orepeza and some Latino voters and leaders backed Richardson.  Richardson's victory in the primary did depend on Black voters but final results showed that Richardson won over many Latino voters and leaders.

Current population estimate in California project a large increase in the Latino population in California over the next 40 years while the population of Blacks, Asian Americans, and Whites as a percentage of total population is expected to decline  The dynamics of race relations in the special election could be foretelling of some political races in the future.

Interesting Election Information
Laura Richardson during her victory speech: "It's not just about money and it's not just about the number of years you've served. It's about what's in your heart" .
Oropeza and Richardson released polls, each showing that person in the lead .
Richardson was a former aide to Millender-McDonald.
Richardson used a mailing, just days before the primary, to criticize Orepeza for missing votes, but did not mention that Oropeza missed these votes because she was being treated for cancer.  Two other mailers also targeted Oropeza "for taking pay raises and claiming to have a bachelor's degree from Cal State Long Beach, when, in fact, she had failed to get credit for two classes, leaving her without a diploma."
 Richardson pledged on a cable TV Public-access television show candidate debate that she will not vote for any new funding for the Iraq war. After being elected, she said she had not made up her mind how she will vote.

See also
List of special elections to the United States House of Representatives

External links

Candidate web sites

Democratic
Peter Mathews for Congress web site
Jenny Oropeza for Congress web site
Laura Richardson for Congress web site
Ed Wilson for Congress web site

Green
Daniel Brezenoff for Congress web site

Libertarian
Herb Peters for Congress web site

Republican
John Kanaley for Congress web site

References
https://web.archive.org/web/20070927210432/http://www.oropeza4congress.com/endorsements.htm
https://web.archive.org/web/20070701000708/http://www.laurarichardsonforcongress.com/
http://www.latimes.com/news/local/la-me-race27jun27,1,2407506.story?coll=la-headlines-california
http://launionaflcio.org/news/07_06_27-Unions-Help-Elect-Richardson.php

http://smartvoter.org/sv/2007/08/21/ca/la/ballot.html

California 2007 37
California 2007 37
2007 37 Special
California 37 Special
United States House of Representatives 37 Special
United States House of Representatives 2007 37